Scopula nupta is a moth of the family Geometridae. It was described by Arthur Gardiner Butler in 1878. It is found in Japan, China and the Russian Far East.

References

Moths described in 1878
nupta
Moths of Asia
Taxa named by Arthur Gardiner Butler